Jeffrey Richardson (born September 1, 1944) is a former American football offensive lineman who played three seasons in the American Football League with the New York Jets and Miami Dolphins. He was drafted by the New York Jets in the sixth round of the 1967 NFL Draft. Richardson played college football at Michigan State University and attended Johnstown High School in Johnstown, Pennsylvania. He was a member of the New York Jets team that won Super Bowl III.

References

External links
Just Sports Stats
Fanbase profile

Living people
1944 births
American football offensive linemen
African-American players of American football
Michigan State Spartans football players
New York Jets players
Miami Dolphins players
Sportspeople from Johnstown, Pennsylvania
American Football League players
21st-century African-American people
20th-century African-American sportspeople